Douglas McPhail (April 16, 1914 – December 6, 1944) was an American actor and singer, active from the 1930s to 1944, when he committed suicide.  He was married to Betty Jaynes.

Filmography

References

External links

1914 births
1944 deaths
American male film actors
20th-century American male actors
Metro-Goldwyn-Mayer contract players
Suicides in California
20th-century American singers
20th-century American male singers
1944 suicides